Herpyllobiidae is a family of cyclopoid copepods in the order Cyclopoida. There are about 6 genera and more than 20 described species in Herpyllobiidae.

Genera
These six genera belong to the family Herpyllobiidae:
 Eurysilenium M. Sars, 1870
 Gottoniella López-González, Bresciani & Conradi, 2006
 Hedyphanella
 Herpyllobius Steenstrup & LÃ¼tken, 1861
 Phallusiella Leigh-Sharpe, 1926
 Thylacoides Gravier, 1912

References

Cyclopoida
Articles created by Qbugbot
Crustacean families